Alison Ellen Field is an American epidemiologist. Field currently serves as professor and chair of epidemiology at the Brown University School of Public Health and professor of pediatrics at Brown's Alpert Medical School.

Early life and education
Field earned her Bachelor of Arts degree in Psychology from the University of California, Berkeley and Doctor of Science in Epidemiology from the Harvard T.H. Chan School of Public Health. While completing her post-doctoral fellowship at Harvard University in 1996, she helped launch the Growing Up Today Study (GUTS), a long-term study to inform eating disorder and obesity prevention and treatment.

Career
Upon completing her ScD, Field joined the faculty at Boston Children's Hospital from 2002 until 2015 while simultaneously working at Harvard Medical School. While there, she continued to work on GUTS and found that frequent dieting among children ages 9 to 14 was both ineffective and harmful, as they gained weight long term in the future. Later, she found that children in the high normal weight range have an elevated risk of becoming overweight or obese as adults and boys with higher childhood BMI's were at greater risk for hypertension as they grew older. In 2008, Field led a study analyzing data of girls and boys between the ages of 9 to 15 from 1996 to 2003 to examine the association between various risk factors and the development of frequent binge eating, and purging.

As a result of her research into dieting and eating disorders, Field was a part of a working group who revised the eating disorder diagnostic criteria in 2013. She came to her conclusions using data from GUTS and the Avon Longitudinal Study of Parents and Children (ALSPAC) to best identify how eating disorders should be classified. In 2015, Field joined the faculty at Brown University. As a professor of epidemiology and pediatrics, Field led a study finding that children who engage in intense and long hours of activity per week were more likely to be injured.

References

External links

Living people
American women epidemiologists
American epidemiologists
Brown University faculty
Harvard University faculty
University of California, Berkeley alumni
Harvard School of Public Health alumni
Year of birth missing (living people)
21st-century American women